Lupinus duranii is a species of lupine known by the common name Mono Lake lupine. It is endemic to California, where it is known mainly from the eastern slopes of the Sierra Nevada in western Mono County. Its distribution includes Mammoth Mountain and the hills around Mono Lake, and its habitat has gravelly, pumice-rich soils of volcanic origin.

It is almost identical to the nominate variety of Brewer's lupine, which occurs commonly in the same region. Besides the fact that L. breweri does not occur on pumice flats, the pair are difficult to separate.

Description
The inflorescence is a crowded raceme of flowers, each about a centimeter long and arranged in whorls about the stout, hairy stem. The flower is purple with a white patch on its banner.

References

External links
Jepson Manual Treatment
Photo gallery

duranii
Endemic flora of California
Flora of the Sierra Nevada (United States)
Natural history of Mono County, California
Taxa named by Alice Eastwood